Natela Dzalamidze and Veronika Kudermetova were the defending champions, but decided not to participate.

Berfu Cengiz and Anna Danilina won the title after defeating Akgul Amanmuradova and Ekaterine Gorgodze 3–6, 6–3, [10–7] in the final.

Seeds

Draw

Draw

References
Main Draw

President's Cup (tennis) - Doubles
President's Cup (tennis)